Normanton is an electoral ward of the City of Wakefield district used for elections to Wakefield Metropolitan District Council.

Overview 
The ward is one of 21 in the Wakefield district, and has been held by Labour since the current boundaries were formed for the 2004 Council election. The predecessor ward was Normanton and Sharlston. As of 2019, the electorate stands at 12,315 of which 92.7% identify as "White British" and 67.9% of who identify as Christian.

The ward comprises Normanton, Kirkthorpe, Woodhouse, Warmfield cum Heath and Ashfield with the key landmarks being Normanton railway station, All Saints' Church and Kirkthorpe Hydro.

Representation 
Like all wards in the Wakefield district, Normanton has 3 councillors, whom are elected on a 4-year-rota. This means elections for new councillors are held for three years running, with one year every four years having no elections.

The current councillors are Elaine Blezzard and David Dagger, both of whom are Labour. There are only currently two councillors due to the death of Alan Wassell who had been the councillor since 2012 and had served on Normanton Town Council for 33 years.

Councillors

Ward results

References 

Politics of Wakefield
Wards of Wakefield
Normanton, West Yorkshire